is a railway station on the Ube Line in Ube, Yamaguchi Prefecture, Japan, operated by West Japan Railway Company (JR West).

Lines
Ubeshinkawa Station is served by the Ube Line, with through services to and from the Onoda Line.

Layout
The station has a "Midori no Madoguchi" staffed ticket office.

History

The first station opened on January 9, 1914. The station was moved and rebuilt at the current location on August 1, 1923.

The station is depicted in the 2021 anime film Evangelion: 3.0+1.0 Thrice Upon a Time, directed by Ube native Hideaki Anno.

See also
 List of railway stations in Japan

References

External links

  

Stations of West Japan Railway Company
Railway stations in Yamaguchi Prefecture
Railway stations in Japan opened in 1914